(literally: 'Love and Tiny Toes';) is a 1992 Portuguese-language Portuguese-French-Spanish film of romantic drama genre, directed and written by Luís Filipe Rocha and Izaías Almada, and starring Joaquim de Almeida, Ana Torrent and Jean-Pierre Cassel. It is based on the novel  by the Macanese writer Henrique de Senna Fernandes. The film was premiered in Macau on 20 March 1992, and was released in France on 21 October of the same year. In Portugal it was released on 15 January 1993, and in Spain on 6 August of the same year.

Summary 
The film shows the social difficulties of a romance born on a cold night in Macau, when a seductive playboy is in love with a young woman who washes his toes. The story serves to make a portrait of the Portuguese colonialist society of Macau. In the end of the 19th century, the Portuguese Christian society melancholically looks towards Europe and proudly turns its back on China. In this context the love between Francisco and Victorina reflects all the contradictions of the social nucleus to which they belong.

Cast 

 Joaquim de Almeida as Francisco Frontaria
 Ana Torrent as Victorina Vidal
 Jean-Pierre Cassel as Gonçalo Botelho
 João D'Ávila as Hipólito
 Omero Antonutti as Padilla
 Gemma Cuervo as Cesaltina
 Pilar Bardem as Amparo
 María Elena Flores as Carmencita
 Henrique Viana as Timoteo
 Manuela Cassola as Titi Bita
 José Manuel Mendes as padre Miguel
 Isidoro Fernández as Silvério
 Vítor Norte as Leopoldo
 Alberto Larumbe as Camilo
 Rui Luís Brás as Mezicles
 Henrique de Senna Fernandes as Barreto
 Manuela Couto as Victorina (voice)
 João Lourenço as Gonçalo Botelho (voice)

Production 
The film was shot in Macau, places including the Lou Lim Ieoc Garden, during the Portuguese administration in the territory.

Awards and nominations

References

External links 
 

1992 films
1990s Portuguese-language films
Portuguese romantic drama films
French romantic drama films
Spanish romantic drama films
1992 romantic drama films
Films directed by Luís Filipe Rocha
Films shot in Macau
Films set in Macau
Films set in 1897
Films set in the 1900s
Films based on Portuguese novels
1990s French films